The south-eastern Kimberley sandslider  (Lerista greeri)  is a species of skink found in Western Australia.

References

Lerista
Reptiles described in 1982
Taxa named by Glen Milton Storr